UAB may stand for:

Uždaroji akcinė bendrovė, a type of limited liability company in Lithuania

Organizations
Apostolic United Brethren, polygamist Mormon fundamentalist church
University of Alabama at Birmingham, a public research university in Birmingham, Alabama, USA
 UAB Blazers, the athletic program of the above school
Autonomous University of Barcelona, a public university in Barcelona, Catalonia, Spain
Unemployment Assistance Board, a British governmental authority that operated from 1934 to 1940
Underwater Archaeology Branch, Naval History & Heritage Command, a United States Navy unit devoted to underwater archaeology